The following are the national records in Olympic weightlifting in New Zealand. Records are maintained in each weight class for the snatch lift, clean and jerk lift, and the total for both lifts by Olympic Weightlifting New Zealand (OWNZ).

Current records

Men

Women

Historical records

Men (1998–2018)

Women (1998–2018)

References
General
New Zealand Weightlifting Records 16 November 2020 updated
Specific

External links
OWNZ official web site

New Zealand
records
Olympic weightlifting
weightlifting